In mathematics, a basic algebraic operation is any one of the common operations of arithmetic, which include addition, subtraction, multiplication, division, raising to a whole number power, and taking roots (fractional power). These operations may be performed on numbers, in which case they are often called arithmetic operations. They may also be performed, in a similar way, on variables, algebraic expressions, and more generally, on elements of algebraic structures, such as groups and fields. An algebraic operation may also be defined simply as a function from a Cartesian power of a set to the same set.

The term algebraic operation may also be used for operations that may be defined by compounding basic algebraic operations, such as the dot product. In calculus and mathematical analysis, algebraic operation is also used for the operations that may be defined by purely algebraic methods. For example, exponentiation with an integer or rational exponent is an algebraic operation, but not the general exponentiation with a real or complex exponent. Also, the derivative is an operation that is not algebraic.

Notation
Multiplication symbols are usually omitted, and implied, when there is no operator between two variables or terms, or when a coefficient is used. For example, 3 × x2 is written as 3x2, and 2 × x × y is written as 2xy. Sometimes, multiplication symbols are replaced with either a dot or center-dot, so that x × y is written as either x . y or x · y. Plain text, programming languages, and calculators also use a single asterisk to represent the multiplication symbol, and it must be explicitly used; for example, 3x is written as 3 * x.

In plain text and programming languages, a slash (also called a solidus) is used, e.g. 3 / (x + 1).

Exponents are usually formatted using superscripts, as in x2. In plain text, the TeX mark-up language, and some programming languages such as MATLAB and Julia, the caret symbol, ^, represents exponents, so x2 is written as x ^ 2. In programming languages such as Ada, Fortran, Perl, Python  and Ruby, a double asterisk is used, so x2 is written as x ** 2.

The plus–minus sign, ±, is used as a shorthand notation for two expressions written as one, representing one expression with a plus sign, the other with a minus sign. For example, y = x ± 1 represents the two equations y = x + 1 and y = x − 1. Sometimes, it is used for denoting a positive-or-negative term such as ±x.

Arithmetic vs algebraic operations
Algebraic operations work in the same way as arithmetic operations, as can be seen in the table below.

Properties of arithmetic and algebraic operations

See also 
 Algebraic expression
 Algebraic function
 Elementary algebra
 Factoring a quadratic expression
 Order of operations

Notes

References

Elementary algebra
Elementary mathematics